Clanbook: Lasombra is a tabletop role-playing game supplement originally published by White Wolf Publishing in June 1996 for use with their game Vampire: The Masquerade, and released in an updated version in 2001.

Contents
Clanbook: Lasombra allows a player to roleplay as a vampire of the clan Lasombra, and offers all its information in a narrative style.

Production

Clanbook: Lasombra was originally developed by Robert Hatch, and written by Richard Dansky and Elizabeth Ditchburn, with art direction by Lawrence Snelly and Aileen E. Miles. The art team also included cover artists Tim Bradstreet, Grant Goleash, and Matt Milberger, and interior artists Pia Guerra, Jason Felix, Fred Hooper, Leif Jones, and Joshua Gabriel Timbrook. The second edition was developed by Justin Achilli and written by Bruce Baugh; its art team included art director Rich Thomas, cover artist John Van Fleet, and interior artists Michael Gaydos, Jones, Andrew Trabbold, Drew Tucker, and Christopher Shy.

White Wolf Publishing originally released Clanbook: Lasombra in June 1996, as a 72-page softcover book, and followed it with the 102-page second edition in 2001. Both editions have since been re-released as ebooks. The second edition was released in French by Hexagonal in 2001.

Reception

Martin Klimes of Arcane comments that "this book is an unequivocal success, and if you have any inclination to play a half-crazed, shadowy Sabbat schemer from Marrakesh or Madrid then you are unlikely to regret spending your money on it. Even accepting the proviso above, referees too can benefit greatly from its contents."

References

1996 books
2001 books
Role-playing game books
Role-playing game supplements introduced in 1996
Vampire: The Masquerade